The province of Pangasinan is divided into 44 municipalities, 3 component cities, and 1 independent component city, all of which are organized into six legislative districts. There are a total of 1,364 barangays in the province.

List of cities and municipalities

See also
Legislative districts of Pangasinan
List of barangays in Pangasinan

References

External links

Populated places in Pangasinan
Government of Pangasinan